"To a Skylark" is a poem completed by Percy Bysshe Shelley in late June 1820 and published accompanying his lyrical drama Prometheus Unbound by Charles and James Ollier in London.

It was inspired by an evening walk in the country near Livorno, Italy, with his wife Mary Shelley, and describes the appearance and song of a skylark they come upon. Mary Shelley described the event that inspired Shelley to write "To a Skylark": "In the Spring we spent a week or two near Leghorn (Livorno)  ... It was on a beautiful summer evening while wandering among the lanes whose myrtle hedges were the bowers of the fire-flies, that we heard the carolling of the skylark."

Alexander Mackie argued in 1906 that the poem, along with John Keats' "Ode to a Nightingale", "are two of the glories of English literature": "The nightingale and the lark for long monopolised poetic idolatry--a privilege they enjoyed solely on account of their pre-eminence as songbirds. Keats's Ode to a Nightingale and Shelley's Ode to a Skylark are two of the glories of English literature, but both were written by men who had no claim to a special or exact knowledge of ornithology as such."

Structure
The poem consists of twenty-one stanzas made up of five lines each. The first four lines are metered in trochaic trimeter, the fifth in iambic hexameter, also called Alexandrine. The rhyme scheme of each stanza is ABABB. There are total 105 lines in this poem.

Summary
The skylark's song is a metaphor or symbol of Nature. As in “The Cloud”, Shelley seeks to understand nature, to find its meaning. This is his objective. The poem is infused with pathos because he knows that this is an illusive quest.

E. Wayne Marjarum argued that the theme was "an ideal being transcending common experience". Irving T. Richards maintained that the poem represented "the ideal being's full isolation from mundanity" in which "rhetorical questions concerning the source of his ideal's inspiration" are addressed.

Influence

Thomas Hardy wrote the poem "Shelley's Skylark" which referenced the work in 1887 after a trip to Leghorn or Livorno, Italy: "The dust of the lark that Shelley heard."

The 1941 comic play Blithe Spirit by Noël Coward takes its title from the opening line: "Hail to thee, blithe Spirit! / Bird thou never wert".

In 1894, music by British composer Arthur Goring Thomas was set to verses from the work in the composition The Swan and the Skylark: Cantata orchestrated by Sir Charles Villiers Stanford.

The poem was quoted in the 1979 musical Shelley which was written and directed by Moma Murphy with music composed by Ralph Martell.

In 2004, Mark Hierholzer set the lyrics to music in a score for chorus with keyboard accompaniment entitled "Ode to a Skylark".

In 2006, American composer Kevin Mixon wrote a score for band with an eponymous title based on the poem. Mixon explained: "I wanted to capture the exuberance in Shelley's To a Skylark."

The UK Royal Mail issued a postage stamp on April 7, 2020 commemorating Percy Bysshe Shelley's "To a Skylark" as part of a series of ten stamps on The Romantic Poets.

References

Sources
 Behrendt, Stephen C. Shelley and His Audiences. University of Nebraska Press: Lincoln and London, 1989.
 Burt, Mary Elizabrth, ed. Poems That Every Child Should Know. BiblioBazaar, 2009. First published in 1904 in New York by Doubleday, Page & Company.
 Cervo, Nathan. "Hopkins' 'The Caged Skylark' and Shelley's 'To a Skylark.'" Explicator, 47.1(1988): 16–20.
 Costa, Fernanda Pintassilgo da. "Shelley e Keats: 'To a Skylark', 'Ode on a Nightingale'." Unpublished BA thesis, Universidade de Coirnbra. Bibliography (1944): 333.
 Doggett, Frank. "Romanticism's Singing Bird." SEL: Studies in English Literature 1500–1900, Vol. 14, No. 4, Nineteenth Century (Autumn, 1974), pp. 547–561.
 Ford, Newell F. "Shelley's 'To a Skylark'." Keats-Shelley Memorial Bulletin, XI, 1960, pp. 6–12.
Holbrook, Morris B. "Presidential Address: The Role of Lyricism in Research on Consumer Emotions: Skylark, Have You Anything to Say to Me?" in NA - Advances in Consumer Research, Volume 17, eds. Marvin E. Goldberg, Gerald Gorn, and Richard W. Pollay, Provo, UT: Association for Consumer Research, pp. 1–18.
 Hunter, Parks, C., Jr. "Undercurrents of Anacreontics in Shelley's 'To a Skylark' and 'The Cloud'. Studies in Philology, Vol. 65, No. 4 (Jul. 1968), pp. 677–692.
 Lewitt, Philip Jay. "Hidden Voices: Bird-Watching in Shelley, Keats, and Whitman." Kyushu American Literature, 28 (1987): 55–63.
 MacEachen, Dougald B. CliffsNotes on Shelley's Poems. 18 July 2011. 
 Mackie, Alexander. Nature Knowledge in Modern Poetry. New York: Longmans-Green & Company, 1906. OCLC 494286564.
 Mahoney, John L. "Teaching 'To a Sky-Lark' in Relation to Shelley's Defense." Hall, Spencer (ed.). Approaches to Teaching Shelley's Poetry. New York: MLA, 1990. 83–85.
 McClelland, Fleming. "Shelley's 'To a Sky-Lark.'" Explicator, 47.1 (1988): 15–16.
 Meihuizen, N. "Birds and Bird-Song in Wordsworth, Shelley and Yeats: The Study of a Relationship between Three Poems." English Studies in Africa, 31.1 (1988): 51–63.
 Norman, Sylvia. Flight of the Skylark: The Development of Shelley's Reputation. Norman: University of Oklahoma Press, 1954.
 O'Neil, Michael. Percy Bysshe Shelley: A Literary Life. The MacMillan Press, Ltd.: London, 1989.
 Richards, Irving T. "A Note on Source Influences in Shelley's Cloud and Skylark," PMLA, Vol. 50, No. 2 (June, 1935), pp. 562–567.
 Runcie, Catherine. (1986) "On Figurative Language: A Reading of Shelley’s, Hardy’s and Hughes’s Skylark Poems," Journal of the Australasian Universities Language and Literature Association, 66:1, 205–217.
 Shawa, W. A. (2015). Styistic Analysis of the Poem 'To A Skylark' by P.B. Shelley." Journal of Humanities and Social Science, 20(3), 124-137.
 SparkNotes Editors. “SparkNote on Shelley’s Poetry.” SparkNotes.com. SparkNotes LLC. 2002. Web. 11 Jul 2011.
 Stevenson, Lionel. "The 'High-Born Maiden' Symbol in Tennyson." PMLA, Vol. 63, No. 1 (Mar., 1948), pp. 234–243.
 Tillman-Hill, Iris. "Hardy's Skylark and Shelley's," VP, 10 (1972), 79–83.
 Tomalin, Claire. Shelley and His World. Thames and Hudson, Ltd.: London, 1980.
 Ulmer, William A. "Some Hidden Want: Aspiration in 'To a Sky-Lark.'" Studies in Romanticism, 23.2 (1984): 245–58.
 White, Ivey Newman. Portrait of Shelley. Alfred A. Knopf, Inc.: New York, 1945.
 Wilcox, Stewart C. "The Sources, Symbolism, and Unity of Shelley's 'Skylark'." Studies in Philology, Vol. 46, No. 4 (Oct., 1949), pp. 560–576.
 Zillman, Lawrence John. Shelley's Prometheus Unbound. University of Washington Press: Seattle, 1959.

External links

 
 608. To a Skylark. Online version on Bartleby.com.
 Shelley's Skylark: A Facsimile of the Original Manuscript. Cambridge, MA: Library of Harvard University, 1888.
 An introduction to ‘To a Skylark’. British Library.

1820 poems
British poems
Poetry by Percy Bysshe Shelley
sky
Birds in popular culture